Edmond Herbert Grove-Hills CMG CBE FRS (1 August 1864 – 2 October 1922) was a British soldier and astronomer.

He was born the son of Herbert Augustus and Anna (née Grove, daughter of William Robert Grove) Hills in High Head Castle, Cumberland and educated at Winchester College until 1882, after which he entered the Royal Military Academy, Woolwich. He later adopted the surname Grove-Hills.

Hills received a commission as a lieutenant in the Royal Engineers on 5 July 1884, and was promoted to captain on 1 April 1893. He worked as an instructor at the Royal School of Military Engineering at Chatham, later transferring to surveying duties as a member of the General Staff. In September 1900 he was appointed deputy assistant adjutant general (DAAG) at the War Office, and promotion to major followed on 25 July 1901. He was engaged in the British tribunal to arbitrate the Chile-Argentina boundary dispute. For this service he was appointed a Companion of the Order of St Michael and St George (CMG) in December 1902.

He left the army around 1905 and attempted unsuccessfully to enter politics.

He was elected a Fellow of the Royal Society in 1911, his candidacy citation reading:

He developed an interest in astronomy, and was elected a Fellow of the Royal Astronomical Society. He took part in observations of eclipses of the sun in 1896 (Japan) and 1898 (India). He was recalled from a similar exercise in Russia at the outbreak of World War I in 1914 and appointed Assistant Chief Engineer of Eastern Command. He was awarded CBE in 1918.

He served as president of the Royal Astronomical Society from 1913 to 1915.

He had married in 1892 Juliet Spencer-Bell, daughter of MP James Spencer-Bell.

He is buried in Kensal Green Cemetery, London.

References

1864 births
1922 deaths
20th-century British astronomers
Fellows of the Royal Society
People educated at Winchester College
Fellows of the Royal Astronomical Society
Burials at Kensal Green Cemetery
Commanders of the Order of the British Empire
Companions of the Order of St Michael and St George
Presidents of the Royal Astronomical Society
19th-century British astronomers